The 2015 Yukon Men's Curling Championship was held January 9 to 15 at the Whitehorse Curling Club in Whitehorse, Yukon. It was the first territorial men's championship to be held since the Yukon gained a direct entry to the Brier, Canada's national men's curling championship. Prior to 2015, the top two teams in the territory played in the Yukon/NWT Men's Curling Championship, with the winner going to the Brier. The winning team represented the Yukon at the 2015 Tim Hortons Brier.

Teams
Six teams entered the event:

Standings

Scores

January 9
Draw 1
Hilderman 14-1 Williams
Paslawski 8-4 Mikkelsen
Smallwood 9-4 Wallingham

Draw 2
Smallwood 7-2 Paslawski
Wallingham 9-5 Hilderman
Mikkelsen 9-3 Williams

January 10
Draw 3
Wallingham 7-5 Williams
Smallwood 9-4 Mikkelsen
Paslawski 8-7 Hilderman

Draw 4
Hilderman 10-5 Mikkelsen
Paslawski 11-8 Wallingham
Smallwood 10-8 Williams

January 11
Draw 5
Smallwood 7 - Hilderman 6
Williams 4 - Paslawski 6
Mikkelsen 5 - Wallingham 4

References

External links
Yukon Curling Association

2015 Tim Hortons Brier
Curling in Yukon
Sport in Whitehorse
2015 in Yukon